Victor C. Wallin (May 27, 1899 – June 8, 1981) was an American politician and businessman who served as member of the Wisconsin State Assembly.

Early life and education
Wallin was born in Washburn, Wisconsin. He graduated from La Salle Extension University with a degree in accounting.

Career 
After graduating from college, Wallin in petroleum, general merchandise, and insurance.

Wallin served as town chairman and member of the Bayfield County, Wisconsin Board of Supervisors. He lived in Grand View, Wisconsin. Wallin served in the Wisconsin State Assembly from 1951 until 1958, when he was defeated for re-election. He was a Republican.

Personal life 
Wallin and his wife, Edith, married in 1922 and had three children. He died on June 8, 1981, in Bayfield, Wisconsin.

References

People from Washburn, Wisconsin
La Salle Extension University alumni
Businesspeople from Wisconsin
Mayors of places in Wisconsin
County supervisors in Wisconsin
Republican Party members of the Wisconsin State Assembly
1899 births
1981 deaths
20th-century American politicians
20th-century American businesspeople